Soukphaxay Sithisane (born 1 May 1996) is a Laotian judoka. 

He competed at the 2016 Summer Olympics in Rio de Janeiro, in the men's 60 kg, but was defeated in the first round by Tsai Ming-yen.

He represented Laos at the 2020 Summer Olympics in Tokyo, Japan. He was eliminated in his first match in the men's 60 kg event.

References

External links
 

1996 births
Living people
People from Vientiane
Laotian male judoka
Olympic judoka of Laos
Judoka at the 2016 Summer Olympics
Judoka at the 2020 Summer Olympics
Judoka at the 2014 Asian Games
Southeast Asian Games medalists in judo
Southeast Asian Games medalists for Laos
Judoka at the 2018 Asian Games
Competitors at the 2015 Southeast Asian Games
Asian Games competitors for Laos